Unheilig  (German for "Unholy") was a German band that featured a variety of influences, including various pop and electronic styles as well as harder, nihilistic hard rock. The band was founded in 1999 and principally consisted of singer Bernd Heinrich "Der Graf" (the Earl) along with various musical partners. He was accompanied for live shows with musicians Christoph "Licky" Termühlen, Henning Verlage, and Martin "Potti" Potthoff. The group's debut, Phosphor, came out in 2000.

History

Early years (1999–2009)

Bernd Heinrich Graf (a.k.a. "Der Graf", "The Count") founded Unheilig in 1999 with Grant Stevens (writer of  "Everlasting Friends", a song featured in a German television commercial for Holsten Pilsener beer) and José Alvarez-Brill (Wolfsheim, Joachim Witt, De/Vision).

Their first single "Sage Ja!" (Say Yes!) was released on Bloodline Records in 1999. It entered the Deutsche Alternative Charts and became popular in night clubs. In February 2001 Unheilig's debut album "Phosphor" was published in Europe.

Over the next few months, the band guested at major festivals and open-air events in Germany (Zillo Open Air, Wave-Gotik-Treffen Leipzig, Doomsday Festival, Woodstage Festival) before taking a break from live work to write and produce the Christmas album Frohes Fest (Merry Christmas) released in 2002 and the third album Das 2. Gebot (The 2nd Commandment).

In February 2003, the band toured eleven European cities as support to L'Âme Immortelle, and played songs from the album Das 2. Gebot.

Directly after the tour, the EP Schutzengel (Guardian Angel) was released, including four previously unreleased tracks. The band played in festivals during the summer. The M'era Luna Festival was one of the highlights for the band and the fans. Der Graf produced remixes for Absurd Minds, Terminal Choice and other bands and produced a song for the Xbox game Project Gotham Racing 2. Then the band started recording the album "Zelluloid".

Zelluloid was released on 23 February 2004, and at the same time, the band toured with Terminal Choice. A fan vote organised by Unheilig chose the tracks for the EP Freiheit, released 18 October 2004.

Unheilig played more concerts in 2004 than any previous year. A live album Gastspiel was released on 31 January 2005.
Six weeks before release of their DVD "Kopfkino" A mainstream music television channel (VIVA Plus) broadcast an Unheilig song video for the first time – the video of "Freiheit".

The album "Moderne Zeiten" (Modern Times) was released on 20 January 2006. The theme of the album is dreams.

During 2007 the band played a small number of festivals including Wacken Open Air, Amphi festival and Burgrock Altena festival.

In 2008, Unheilig released the album "Puppenspiel". It entered the Media Control Charts at number 13.

In 2008, they played at the (M'era Luna, Zita-Rock, Wave-Gotik-Treffen and Castle Rock) festivals. Later the band released their second DVD titled "Vorhang auf" ("Curtain Up").

In 2009, the band performed at the Amphi Festival, Summer Breeze Open Air and the Rockharz Open Air festivals.

On 3 July 2009, the albums Phosphor, Frohes Fest, Das 2. Gebot, Zelluloid and Moderne Zeiten were released with new artwork and remastered audio.  The Limited Edition versions of the albums that included extra songs were not re-released.

Große Freiheit and Lichter der Stadt (2009–2013)
On 7 December 2009, the official Unheilig website received a major redesign to reflect the upcoming release of Große Freiheit, including a three-minute trailer showcasing Der Graf with a suitcase playing "Das Meer", the very first song off the new album.

On 14 January 2010, the first music video for their first single "Geboren um zu leben" (Born to Live) was posted on Unheilig's webpage. The single "Geboren um zu leben" was released on 29 January 2010 and debuted on the Media Control Charts at number two. The single also peaked on the Austrian Singles Chart at number eight.

Große Freiheit was released on 19 February 2010 under Vertigo Records part of Universal Records, with a tour following immediately. The new album would then go on to peak in the Media Control Charts at number 1, in Austria at number 2 and in Switzerland at number 3. The band performed at the Greenfield Festival in Switzerland on 12 June.

The second single "Für immer" was released on 21 May & Peaked in the German Charts at No. 17.

Große Freiheit would break records as the longest staying No. 1 album on the German Media Control Charts, staying at No. 1 for 23 non-consecutive weeks. This beats the old record set by Herbert Grönemeyer in 1988 with the album Ö, which stayed at No. 1 for 14 weeks.

The third single "Unter deiner Flagge" was released on 24 September 2010 and peaked in the German charts at No. 13.
On 1 October the band performed the song Unter Deiner Flagge at the Bundesvision Song Contest held at Max-Schmeling-Halle, as a result they won the contest, beating other acts like (Silly, Ich + Ich, Blumentopf) among others.

Winterland was released on 19 November 2010 as a fourth single from Große Freiheit, as it was also a part of the "Große Freiheit (Winter Edition)" as a separate CD containing remixes. The single would then become Unheilig's third top ten single in Germany, peaking at No. 4.

On 25 March 2011, Unheilig was nominated for five ECHO Awards (Best Video National for Geboren um zu leben, ECHO Radio, Most Successful Production Team, Best National Rock/Alternative Group and Album of the Year for Große Freiheit), eventually winning three.

On 16 February 2011, Unheilig announced they were writing new material for their upcoming 8th album Lichter der Stadt (City Lights), which will be a concept album. On 2 December the band announced that the first single from Lichter der Stadt, So wie du warst, will be released on 24 February 2012 while the album itself will be released 16 March 2012. The second single Lichter der Stadt was released on 30 March 2012.

The third single "Wie wir waren" was released on 31 August 2012. Unheilig will be releasing "Lichter Der Stadt: Winter Edition" on 23 November 2012. This new edition will feature the newly released song "Stark".

On 18 January 2013, Unheilig released a 7-CD audiobiography titled Als Musik meine Sprache wurde. The CD comes with six CDs full of Der Graf's musical journey from his earlier beginnings all the way up to his success with Große Freiheit and Lichter Der Stadt.
The 7th CD is complete with 13 songs from his beginning days including Human Nations.

Alles hat seine Zeit, Gipfelstürmer, Ein letztes Mal tour, and final album (2014–2016)
The band released their first "best of" album titled Alles Hat Seine Zeit on 14 March 2014. The album debuted on the Media Control charts at number 2, the Austrian albums chart at number 3 and the Swiss albums chart at number 5.

At the Rock the Ring Festival in Switzerland in June 2014 Unheilig played "Goldrausch", a track from their then-upcoming album Gipfelstürmer. The first single from the album, "Zeit Zu Gehen", was released on 31 October.

The album Gipfelstürmer was released on 12 December 2014 and became the band's third consecutive album to reach number one on the Media Control Charts in Germany. The album also peaked at number two on the Swiss albums chart. Unheilig then went on tour to promote the new album, beginning 6 April 2015 in Vienna, Austria, at the Vienna Stadthalle and concluding on 20 February 2016 in Kreuzlingen, Switzerland at the Bodensee Arena.

The band released a DVD entitled MTV Unplugged: Unter Dampf – Ohne Strom on 12 December 2015. The DVD would go on to earn the band an Echo Award nomination for Best Rock Band/Pop National in 2016.

Unheilig embarked on their final tour as a band on 13 May, which finished on 10 September 2016 at the RheinEnergieStadion. Megaherz, Staubkind, "Be One", Schandmaul and Megazwei were all supporting acts during the Ein Letzte Mal Tournee.

Unheilig announced on 2 August 2016 that they would release their final album, Von Mensch Zu Mensch, on 4 November 2016. The first single from the album, also titled "Von Mensch Zu Mensch", was released on 2 August. The second single "Ich würd' dich gern Besuchen" was released on 9 September. The third single, "Mein Leben ist die Freiheit", was released on 7 October.

Post-2016

Von Mensch zu Mensch was nominated for Best Pop National at the 2017 ECHO Awards.

Unheilig will release a new best of album titled Best of Vol. 2 – Pures Gold on 6 October 2017.

Despite Der Graf's retirement, Unheilig will continue as a band without him.

Band members
Bernd "Der Graf" Heinrich Graf – vocals, programming (1999–2016)
Henning Verlage – keyboards, programming (2003–present)
Christoph "Licky" Termühlen – guitars (2002–present)
Martin "Potti" Potthoff – drums and percussion (2008–present)

Awards and nominations

Contests
2010 Bundesvision Song Contest winner
Unser Song für Dänemark runner-up

Discography

Studio albums

Live albums

Singles
{|class="wikitable" style="text-align:center"
|-
!rowspan="2"|Year
!rowspan="2"|Title
!colspan="4"|Peak chart positions
!rowspan="2"|Certifications(sales thresholds)
!rowspan="2"|Album
|-
!style="width:3em;font-size:75%"| GER
!style="width:3em;font-size:75%"| AUT
!style="width:3em;font-size:75%"| SWI
!style="width:3em;font-size:75%"| EU
|-
|2000
|style="text-align:left;"|"Sage Ja!"
| — || — || — || —
|
|rowspan="2"|Phosphor
|-
|2001
|style="text-align:left;"|"Komm zu mir"
| — || — || — || —
|
|-
|2003
|style="text-align:left;"|"Maschine"
| — || — || — || —
|
|Das 2. Gebot
|-
|2006
|style="text-align:left;"|"Ich will leben" (feat. Project Pitchfork)
| — || — || — || —
|
|Goldene Zeiten
|-
|2008
|style="text-align:left;"|"An deiner Seite"
| 49 || — || — || —
|
|Puppenspiel
|-
| rowspan="4"| 2010
|style="text-align:left;"|"Geboren um zu leben"
| 2 || 8 || 13 || 13
|
 GER: 2× Platinum
 SWI: Platinum
|rowspan="3"|Große Freiheit
|-
|style="text-align:left;"|"Für immer"
| 17 || 51 || 57 || —
|
|-
|style="text-align:left;"|"Unter deiner Flagge"
| 9 || 29 || — || 38
|
|-
|style="text-align:left;"|"Winter"
| 4 || 6 || 64 || 21
|
 GER: Gold
|Große Freiheit (Winter Edition)
|-
| rowspan="4"| 2012
|style="text-align:left;"|"So wie du warst"
| 2 || 14 || 18 || —
|
 GER: Gold
|rowspan="3"| Lichter der Stadt
|-
|style="text-align:left;"|"Lichter der Stadt"
| 31 || — || — || —
|
|-
|style="text-align:left;"|"Wie wir waren" (featuring Andreas Bourani)
| 32 || 60 || — || —
|
|-
|style="text-align:left;"|"Stark"
| 23 || 49 || — || —
|
| Lichter der Stadt (Winter Edition)
|-
|rowspan="3"| 2014
|style="text-align:left;"|"Als wär's das erste Mal"
| 10 || 38 || 56 || —
|
|rowspan="2"| Alles hat seine Zeit
|-
|style="text-align:left;"|"Wir sind alle wie eins"
| 29 || — || — || —
|
|-
|style="text-align:left;"|"Zeit zu gehen"
| 6 || 16 || 8 || —
|
|rowspan="3"|Gipfelstürmer
|-
|rowspan="2"| 2015
|style="text-align:left;"|"Mein Berg"
| — || — || — || —
|
|-
|style="text-align:left;"|"Glück auf das Leben"
| — || — || — || —
|
|-
|rowspan="3"| 2016
|style="text-align:left;"|"Von Mensch zu Mensch"
| — || — || — || —
|
|rowspan="3"|Von Mensch zu Mensch
|-
|style="text-align:left;"|"Ich würd' dich gern besuchen| — || — || — || —
|
|-
|style="text-align:left;"|"Mein Leben ist die Freiheit"
| — || — || — || —
|
|}

EPs
 2002: Tannenbaum (as part of the Frohes Fest limited edition release)
 2003: Schutzengel (limited to 2,222 copies)
 2004: Freiheit 2006: Astronaut (limited to 4,444 copies)
 2008: Spiegelbild (limited to 3,333 copies)
 2010: Winterland Special (as part of the Große Freiheit (Winter Edition) release)
 2010: Zeitreise (limited 10th anniversary tour-only release)
 2012: Lichtblicke (exclusive Lichter der Stadt tour CD)

DVDs
 2005: Kopfkino (Germany #75)
 2008: Vorhang auf (Germany #3)
 2010: Sternstunde (only available during the Große Freiheit tour)
 2010: Große Freiheit Live (Germany No. 1, Gold)
 2012: Lichter der Stadt Live 2015: Unter Dampf – Ohne StromMusic videos

Other CDs
 2008: Schattenspiel (limited to 3,333 copies)
 2013: Als Musik meine Sprache wurde (7-CD audiobiography)
 2014: Alles hat seine Zeit – Best of 1999–2014 (GER #2, AT#3, CH#5)
 2015: Gipfelkreuz (exclusive Gipfelstürmer tour CD)
 2016: Danke! – Ein letztes mal (live; exclusive Ein letztes Mal tour CD)
 2017: Best of Vol. 2 – Pures Gold (GER #2, AT #15, CH #15)

Re-releases
2009: Phosphor2009: Frohes Fest2009: Das 2. Gebot2009: Zelluloid2009: Moderne Zeiten2011: Kopfkino''

References

External links 

 Official site

German rock music groups
German pop rock music groups
German electronic music groups
German industrial music groups
German electronic rock musical groups
German industrial metal musical groups
German industrial rock musical groups
German gothic rock groups
German Neue Deutsche Härte music groups
Musical groups established in 1999
Participants in the Bundesvision Song Contest
1999 establishments in Germany